Mohammed Taslimuddin (4 January 1943 – 17 September 2017) was an Indian politician and a veteran RJD leader. He hailed from the village of Sisauna in the Araria district of Bihar. He started his political career as a sarpanch and was elected to the Bihar Legislative Assembly for the first time in 1969, serving as an MLA eight times. In 1989, he was first elected to the Lok Sabha from the Purnia constituency. He was thrice elected as an MP from the Kishanganj constituency in 1996, 1998 and 2004. He served his final stint as an MP in the 16th Lok Sabha after being elected from the Araria constituency.

He died on 17 September 2017 at the age of 74 after being treated for respiratory problems in Chennai,  he was laid to rest with state honours on 19 September 2017 at his birthplace located in Sisauna jokihat.

Political History
Mohammed Taslimuddin was born in 1943, Sisauna village of district Araria, Bihar. In the year 1969, it was the first time he was elected to the Bihar Legislative Assembly as a Congress nominee. In the year 1989, he was elected as a Janata Dal candidate from district Purnea, Bihar also in the years of 1996, 1998, 2004 and 2014. In the year 1995, he won from the Jokihat seat as a Samajwadi Party candidate. In the year 1996, he fought Lok Sabha seat as a Janata Dal nominee from Kishanganj and he won. In the year 1996, in the government of HD Deve Gowda, he was a Union Minister of state for home affairs.

References

|-

1943 births
2017 deaths
India MPs 1989–1991
India MPs 1996–1997
India MPs 1998–1999
India MPs 2004–2009
India MPs 2014–2019
Union ministers of state of India
Rashtriya Janata Dal politicians
Janata Dal politicians
People from Araria
Indian Muslims
People from Kishanganj district
Lok Sabha members from Bihar
Janata Dal (Secular) politicians